Red 76 is a multi-artist collective started in Portland, Oregon.  Since 2000 they have produced numerous projects and appeared in The New York Times, Artforum and Modern Painters, and shown at Southern Exposure and Yerba Buena Center for the Arts and in projects by Creative Time.

Themes

Red 76's work centers on the practice of grassroots publishing (both zines small newspapers, and online), conversation, and alternative economies which center on a larger theme of the American Revolution (the 76 in their name references 1776, the year the US independence) and a general revolutionary spirit.

Projects like Ghosttown and Taking Place sought  to charge space and create an atmosphere wherein the public may become highly aware of their immediate surroundings, and their day to day activities, is an often recurring element within many of the group's activities.

Members

Red 76 is a moniker for collaboratively based projects conceived most frequently by Sam Gould, and fleshed out by a group of like minded artists. Their projects have taken place in Portland, New York, San Francisco and Prague.

References

External links
 Red 76 Home Page

American artists
American artist groups and collectives
Culture of Portland, Oregon